Cho Gwang-hee ( or  ; born 24 December 1993) is a South Korean canoeist. He competed in the men's K-1 200 metres event at the 2016 Summer Olympics.

References

External links
 

1993 births
Living people
South Korean male canoeists
Olympic canoeists of South Korea
Canoeists at the 2016 Summer Olympics
People from Buyeo County
Asian Games gold medalists for South Korea
Asian Games silver medalists for South Korea
Asian Games medalists in canoeing
Canoeists at the 2014 Asian Games
Canoeists at the 2018 Asian Games
Medalists at the 2014 Asian Games
Medalists at the 2018 Asian Games
Canoeists at the 2020 Summer Olympics
Sportspeople from South Chungcheong Province
20th-century South Korean people
21st-century South Korean people